Martín Fiz Martín (born 3 March 1963 in Vitoria-Gasteiz, Álava) is a long-distance runner from Spain.

Career
Fiz won the marathon at the 1994 European Athletics Championships in Helsinki and repeated his success at the 1995 World Athletics Championships in Gothenburg. The same year he captured the title in the Rotterdam Marathon.

At the 1996 Summer Olympics in Atlanta Fiz came fourth in the marathon. A year later he won a silver medal at the 1997 World Championships in Athletics in Athens, finishing behind his countryman Abel Anton. 

He competed in three consecutive Summer Olympics for his native country, starting in 1992. At the 2000 Summer Olympics in Sydney Fiz came sixth in the marathon.

Post-career
Fiz has continued running into masters age divisions, setting the world M55 record in the road 10K at 31:36 on January 13, 2019 in Valencia.

He is the only athlete in the world who has managed to win in six Majors Marathons in the Master 50 category (runners over 50 years old), winning the Marathons of New York, Tokyo, Boston, Berlin, Chicago, and London, achieving the goal of obtaining the ‘Six World Marathon Majors’, World Marathon Majors, an international competition created in 2006, which brings together six of the most prestigious world Marathons, recognised as the most high profile on the calendar.

International competitions

Personal bests

References

 Spanish Olympic Committee

External links

 

1963 births
Living people
Spanish male long-distance runners
Spanish male marathon runners
Spanish male steeplechase runners
Athletes (track and field) at the 1992 Summer Olympics
Athletes (track and field) at the 1996 Summer Olympics
Athletes (track and field) at the 2000 Summer Olympics
Olympic athletes of Spain
World Athletics Championships medalists
European Athletics Championships medalists
World Athletics Championships winners